Akos Vertes is a Hungarian-American professor of chemistry, biochemistry and molecular biology at the George Washington University and a Doctor of the Hungarian Academy of Sciences.

Early life and career
Vertes was born in Budapest, Hungary. He graduated from the Veres Pálné Gimnázium in 1971 and then got his B.S. and Ph.D. in chemistry from the Eötvös Loránd University in 1974 and 1979 respectively. In 1979 he was appointed research associate at the Hungarian Central Research Institute for Physics and in 1987 was promoted to senior research associate; from 1986 to 1989 he served as its Deputy Head. Until 1991 was an assistant professor at the University of Antwerp in Belgium.

In 1991 he immigrated to the United States and was hired by the George Washington University as an associate professor of Analytical chemistry.  and was promoted to professor in 2000 and to Professor of Biochemistry and Molecular Biology in 2003.

In 1997 he became Deputy Chair of its Department of Chemistry. In 2002 he founded the W. M. Keck Institute for Proteomics Technology and Applications in Washington, D.C. and became co-director.  From 2003 to 2008 he also worked as an adjunct professor at the National Institutes of Health in Bethesda, Maryland.

In 2014 Akos led GWU's Columbian College of Arts and Sciences team to investigate chemical and biological threats.

Research and inventions
In 2008 Akos Vertes had worked with Peter Nemes to develop a laser ablation electrospray ionization, a miniature version of the previous lasers requiring only a desk-sized space in the lab. Four years later this technology, which in the future became known as the LAESI-DP 1000 Direct Ionization System, was ranked as one of the 100 most technologically significant products of 2012 by the R&D Magazine and was ranked top 10 invention by The Scientist.

In 2009 Vertes and colleagues developed a new technology called matrix-assisted laser analytical ionization or MALDI.

In 2012 he worked with Genia Photonics to develop a laser that can detect explosives and illegal drugs.

In 2015 he had created a nano-device called REDIchip capable to detect materials that are made up of as little as 100,000 molecules.

Awards
2007 – Oscar and Shoshana Trachtenberg Prize
2012 – Hillebrand Award
2013 – Fellow of the National Academy of Inventors

References

External links

20th-century births
Living people
American molecular biologists
Hungarian biochemists
Eötvös Loránd University alumni
Columbian College of Arts and Sciences faculty
George Washington University faculty
Members of the Hungarian Academy of Sciences
Scientists from Budapest
20th-century American biochemists
21st-century American biochemists
Year of birth missing (living people)
Hungarian emigrants to the United States